Local elections were held in the Indian state of Telangana on 30 April 2021 for 2 municipal corporations and 5 municipalities, namely Warangal, Khammam, Jadcherla, Achampet, Siddipet, Kothur, and Nakrekal. 

The first elections were held in newly-created municipalities Jadcherla, Kothur, and Nakrekal.

Background 
In the previous elections (for these urban local bodies) held in 2016, the Telangana Rashtra Samithi swept all 4 urban local bodies (Khammam, Warangal, Achampet, Siddipet) by an impressive margin. The 2016 elections resulted in the washing out of the Telugu Desam Party and the weakening of the Indian National Congress and the Bharatiya Janata Party.

Results

By Municipal Corporation 
Greater Warangal Municipal CorporationKhammam Municipal Corporation

By Municipality 
Achampet MunicipalityJadcherla MunicipalityKothur MunicipalityNakrekal MunicipalitySiddipet Municipality

References

Telangana
2020s in Telangana
Local elections in Telangana